Seweryn Michalski (born 12 September 1994) is a Polish professional footballer who plays as a centre-back for III liga club Warta Sieradz.

Club career
He began his club career with his hometown club GKS Bełchatów before moving to Belgian side K.V. Mechelen on 25 June 2013.

On 12 August 2020 he returned to GKS Bełchatów on a one-year contract. On 19 January 2021, he joined Wieczysta Kraków. On 27 July 2022, he left the club by mutual consent.

On 27 August 2022, he was announced to be joining III liga side Warta Sieradz, making his debut on the same day in a goalless draw against Sokół Ostróda.

References

External links
 
 
 

1994 births
Sportspeople from Bełchatów
Living people
Polish footballers
Poland youth international footballers
Poland under-21 international footballers
Association football defenders
Ekstraklasa players
Belgian Pro League players
I liga players
III liga players
IV liga players
GKS Bełchatów players
K.V. Mechelen players
Jagiellonia Białystok players
Chrobry Głogów players
Chojniczanka Chojnice players
Wieczysta Kraków players
Polish expatriate footballers
Expatriate footballers in Belgium
Polish expatriate sportspeople in Belgium